Lou Roy-Lecollinet (born 1 August 1996) is a French actress. She was nominated for the César Award for Most Promising Actress in 2016 for her role in the film My Golden Days.

Life and career 
Lou Roy-Lecollinet was born in Saint-Maur-des-Fossés, a suburb of Paris. While still a lycée pupil, and following the advice of her drama teacher, she auditioned for a role in the film My Golden Days, directed by Arnaud Desplechin. In interviews, she has claimed that she became an actress almost by chance. She told one interviewer, "I didn’t want to be an actress. I wanted to direct plays onstage."

The film, a prequel to the director's earlier My Sex Life... or How I Got into an Argument (1996), was presented at the 2015 Cannes Film Festival. She was nominated for the César Award for Most Promising Actress for her role in it.

Roy-Lecollinet guest starred in the music video for Danny L Harle's song "Broken Flowers" in 2016, released on British label PC Music.

Filmography

References

External links 

 

1996 births
French actresses
Living people